is a Japanese actress. She won the best supporting actress award from the Mainichi in 2004 for The Hidden Blade and Blood and Bones, and the best actress award at the Mainichi Film Awards for The Cowards Who Looked to the Sky in 2012.

Career
Tabata has appeared in films such as Happy Flight and Sankaku She has also appeared in television such as Watashi no Aozora and Shinsengumi!.

Filmography

Films
 Moving (1993)
 Sabu (2002)
 The Hidden Blade (2004)
 Blood and Bones (2004)
 Hana (2006)
 Yellow Tears (2007)
 After School (2008)
 School Days with a Pig (2008)
 Happy Flight (2008) - Natsumi Kimura
 Sankaku (2010)
 A Liar and a Broken Girl (2011)
 Gokudō Meshi (2011) - Aya Kurihara
 Robo-G (2012)
 The Cowards Who Looked to the Sky (2012)
 Before the Vigil (2013)
 Angel Home (2013)
 Lady Maiko (2014)
 Children of Iron (2015)
 Museum (2016)
 The Day's Organ (2019)
 Dad, Chibi is Gone (2019)
 Wachigaiya Itosato (2019)
 Ora, Ora Be Goin' Alone (2020)
 Intolerance (2021) - Shōko Matsumoto
 Haw (2022)
 Insomniacs After School (2023)

Television
 Watashi no Aozora (2000) - Nazuna 
 Shinsengumi! (2004) - Kondo Tsune, Kondo Isami's wife
 Kitaro ga Mita Gyokusai - Mizuki Shigeru no Senso (2007) - Nunoe
 Nene: Onna Taikōki (2009) - Asahi no kata
 First Class (2014) - Shirayuki Kimura

Dubbing
 Lilo & Stitch (2002) - Nani Pelekai

References

External links
 

1980 births
Japanese actresses
Asadora lead actors
Living people
People from Kyoto